Lennart Gustaf Lind (born 12 April 1930) is a retired Swedish pole vaulter. He was eleventh at the 1952 Summer Olympics and fourth at the 1958 European Championships. Lind won the national pole vault title in 1960 after finishing second seven times.

References

1930 births
Living people
Athletes (track and field) at the 1952 Summer Olympics
Olympic athletes of Sweden
Swedish male pole vaulters